Henry's House or William Henry's Old House was a minor trading post near Athabasca Pass in Canada. The normal route over the mountains was from Jasper House on the Athabasca River 120 miles west to Boat Encampment on the Columbia River. To save time one could take a light (non-freight) 50 miles more up the Athabasca River to Henry's House and cross the mountains from there. George Simpson and John McLoughlin used this route in 1824.

References 

Hudson's Bay Company trading posts